John Justus of Landsberg  (1489 – 10 August 1539) was a German Carthusian monk and ascetical writer.
 
His family name was Gerecht, of which Justus is merely a Latin translation. The appellation, however, by which he is generally known is that of Lanspergius (latinization 'of Landsberg'), from his birthplace.

Biography
He was born at Landsberg am Lech in Bavaria 1489, died at Cologne on 11 August 1539. After studying philosophy at the University of Cologne, he joined the Carthusian Order at the age of twenty (1509), entering the Charterhouse of St. Barbara at Cologne. He was named novice-master there in 1520, and in 1530 became prior of the Charterhouse of Vogelsang near Jülich, where according to Hartzheim, he was also preacher (concionator) to the Court of William, Duke of Jülich, and confessor to the duke's mother. Because of bad health in 1534 he had to return to Cologne, where a few years later he was named sub-prior and remained in that office until his death. 
 
He was a monk of saintly life, employing all the time he could spare from his duties towards others in prayer, contemplation and writing on ascetical and mystical subjects.

Writings
His literary works comprise paraphrases and homilies on the Epistles and Gospels of the liturgical year, sermons for Sundays and festivals, meditations and discourses on the Life and Passion of Christ, and a variety of treatises, sermons, letters, meditations etc. on subjects pertaining to the spiritual life.
 
He was not a polemist. Among his productions the only ones of a controversial kind are two dissertations against Lutheran errors (from the Catholic point of view) and in defense of the monastic life. These two treatises are also all that he wrote in German, his other writings being in Latin. 

The chief feature of his writings is ardent and tender piety. The love of God for man, calling for a corresponding love of man for God, is his usual theme treated in various ways. One thing particularly worthy of mark is the frequency with which he speaks of the Heart of Christ, and pressingly exhorts every Christian to take the Sacred Heart as an object of special love, veneration and imitation. Indeed, it may perhaps be said that no one before him had laid down and explained so clearly the principles upon which that devotion is grounded, nor had so developed their practical application. He was one of the last, and was perhaps the most precise in language, of those whose written teachings paved the way for Saint Margaret Mary Alacoque and her mission, and helped to prepare the Catholic mind for the great devotion of modern times. To him also Catholics owed the first Latin edition (Cologne, 1536) of the "Revelations of Saint Gertrude".
 
The best known of his treatises is the "Alloquia Jesu Christi ad animam fidelem", which has been translated into Spanish, Italian, French and English. The English translation, done by Philip Howard, Earl of Arundel, who died in the Tower of London under Elizabeth I, has reached its fourth edition (London, 1867).
 
A new and revised edition of all the works of Lanspergius in Latin has been issued by the Carthusian press of Notre-Dame-des-Prés (Tournai, 1890), in five quarto volumes. The same press has published separately the treatise "Pharetra Divini Amoris" (18mo., 1892) and a French version of the "Alloquia", untitled "Entretiens de Jésus Christ avec l'âme fidèle" (18mo, 1896).

External links

1489 births
1539 deaths
People from Landsberg am Lech
German Christian monks
Roman Catholic writers
University of Cologne alumni
Carthusians